The third and the oldest surviving Triumphal Arch in Moscow was built in 1829–34 on Tverskaya Zastava Square to Joseph Bové's designs in order to commemorate Imperial Russia's victory over Napoleon. It replaced an earlier wooden structure built by the veterans of the Napoleonic Wars in 1814.

The arch was built in brick and lined with ashlar. The columns and statues were of cast iron. A seiuga (six-horse chariot) was designed by Giovanni Vitali. The bilingual inscription in Russian and Latin ran as follows:

The arch was dismantled in 1936 as part of Joseph Stalin's reconstruction of downtown Moscow.
Vitali's sculptures were then put on exhibit at an architectural museum on the grounds of the former Donskoy Monastery. After the Second World War there were plans to rebuild the structure in front of the Belorussky railway station.

The current arch was built to Bove's original designs in 1966–68 in the middle of Kutuzovsky Avenue, close to the Victory Park. An open space surrounding the arch is known as the Victory Square.

See also
 List of post-Roman triumphal arches

References

External links 
 

Triumphal arches in Russia
Military monuments and memorials
Monuments and memorials in Moscow
Neoclassical architecture in Russia
Rebuilt buildings and structures in Russia
Cultural heritage monuments of regional significance in Moscow